The Timor-Leste national football team is the national team of East Timor and is controlled by the Federação de Futebol de Timor-Leste. They joined FIFA on 12 September 2005.

Timor-Leste's international debut was in the preliminary round of the 2004 AFC Asian Cup qualification in March 2003, when they lost 3–2 to Sri Lanka and 3–0 to Chinese Taipei. They also participated in the 2004 AFF Championship. Timor-Leste's participation in Southeast Asia's premier international football event in 2004 was announced after an Asian Football Confederation council meeting in Petaling Jaya. Although not yet a member of the AFC, the Timor-Leste Football Association was invited to sit in on the meeting, where they were represented by FA president Francia Kalbuadi. Timor-Leste won their first international match on 5 October 2012 against Cambodia with a score of 5–1.

History
Football was established in Timor-Leste during the Portuguese colonial era, when many of the locals and the Portuguese officials played amateur football. After Portugal ended its colonial rule, Indonesia invaded and occupied the island. East Timor eventually gained independence from Indonesia in 2000, which resulted in a long running battle against Jakarta-led forces.

The East Timor Football Association was accepted as an associate member of AFC at the 20th AFC Congress in 2002. Their international debut came in March 2003 when they participated in the qualifying campaign for the 2004 AFC Asian Cup in China. Given their history, it was no surprise that they crashed out with defeats against the likes of Sri Lanka and Chinese Taipei. They entered the regional competition for the first time in 2004 as they played in the ASEAN Football Federation Championship (previously known as Tiger Cup) as an invited member. They finished in last place, showing that they had a long way to go before they could compete even on the regional stage.

They again had no success in the qualifying round of the 2007 AFF Championship, with four heavy losses, including a 7–0 trouncing by the Philippines. In the third qualifying round for the 2008 AFF Championship, they surprisingly drew against Cambodia; this feat was reported in international news.

In the ninth AFF Suzuki Cup, the country's football federation (FFTL) reportedly selected their foreign based players, who played in Brazil, Portugal, Australia and elsewhere, to fortify the team as they also did at the 2011 SEA Games.

On 5 October 2012, Timor-Leste won their first international match in a 5–1 victory against Cambodia. On 9 October 2012, the team won another match against Laos at AFF Suzuki Cup qualifier. Murilo de Almeida scored a penalty at 43 minutes of the first half of the match. Later Adelino Trindade extended the Timorese advantage with a header early in the second half and then Alan Leandro added the third goal on the 83rd minute. After winning the second match against Laos, Emerson Alcântara stated "This is a win for the people of Timor Leste. They had to wait a long time for our team to win their first match in this competition but now we have two wins and this was an important victory for Timor Leste. "I think that about 70 percent of people in Timor Leste are poor so it is very important to get this result for them because they love football and the people can get confidence and take pride in this result. It is very important for us to motivate our people and to help to change their lives."

Naturalised players controversy
Since 2012 several Brazilian-born footballers, who are not of East Timorese descent and had not necessarily played in the East Timorese League, were expressly naturalised to raise the level of "Sol Nascente".

The country's recent history of naturalizing foreign players, mainly from Brazil such as Murilo de Almeida, Fellipe Bertoldo, and Diogo Santos Rangel has been criticized by many, including native East Timorese players and fans.

In a match on 8 October 2015 against Palestine seven of the starting eleven for the Timorese line-up were naturalized Brazilians. Following the match the Palestinian Football Association made a complaint to FIFA stating that the naturalized Timorese players were not eligible to represent Timor-Leste under FIFA rules.

Following a concern from some Timorese who complained to the prime minister, the prosecutor general and the minister for justice regarding the naturalisation program, Timor Leste Football Federation (FFTL) decided to drop their oversea-born legion. It meant Timor Leste would be without seven naturalised Brazilian players for the 2018 FIFA World Cup and 2019 AFC Asian Cup joint qualifiers match against United Arab Emirates on 12 November 2015. In that match coach Fernando Alcântara played an all national line up including six who were under twenty, including Ervino Soares who was 16. Timor Leste ended up losing the match 8–0. Alcântara took responsibility for the defeat although he also added that he had been forced to play such an inexperienced line-up by the FFTL.

The next match, Timor-Leste did even worse, suffering a record 0–10 home defeat to a strong Saudi Arabia side, who eventually qualified for the 2018 FIFA World Cup in Russia.

Jesse Pinto, an Australian-Timorese footballer, told reporters that the FFTL gives Brazilian players Timorese passports so that they can be registered as "Asian" players and meet the quotas of teams. Pinto also added that the FFTL often takes advantage of players from poor backgrounds, but that it often did not meet its promises of allowing players to travel back to Brazil to meet their families.

In December 2016, the FFTL was charged with using forged and falsified documents, fielding ineligible players and bringing the game into disrepute.

A decision was made on 20 January 2017 that Timor-Leste is barred from participating in the qualification tournament for the 2023 AFC Asian Cup after being found to have fielded a total of twelve ineligible players in 2019 AFC Asian Cup qualification matches and among other competitions.

Team image

Kit manufacturers 

The team's kit manufacturer was Kubba Sportswear from June 2014 to February 2017.

Since 2018, the kits are made by Narrow, an Indonesian apparel. The home kit is red shirts, black shorts, and red socks, with black as a secondary color. The away kit all white. From 2008 to 2010, their away kits were yellow but at 2010 AFF Suzuki Cup qualification, the away kits changed back into all whites. Their kits were made by Nike in 2012. Previous kit makers include Mitre, Joma, Nike and Tiger.

Stadium 
Timor Leste's home stadium is the East Timor National Stadium in Dili. The stadium capacity is 5,000. The first official match played in the stadium was a 2018 FIFA World Cup qualification match against Mongolia on 12 March 2015.

Results and fixtures

2022

2023

Coaching staff

Coaching history

Players

Current squad
 The following players were called up for the 2022 AFF Championship qualification.
 Match dates: 5 and 8 November 2022
 Oppositions: 
Caps and goals correct as of: 8 November 2022, after the match against

Previous squads
 2004 Tiger Cup squad
 2016 AFC Solidarity Cup squad
 2018 AFF Suzuki Cup squad
 2020 AFF Suzuki Cup squad

Player records

Players in bold are still active with Timor-Leste.

Most capped players

Top goalscorers

Competition records

World Cup record

Notes

Lusofonia Games

Asian Cup record

AFC Challenge Cup record

 2006 – Was originally selected to take part, but was then replaced
2008 –  Was selected to take part, but withdrew

AFC Solidarity Cup record

AFF Championship

Head-to-head record

As of 8 November 2022

References

External links
 Profile at FIFA.com
 Profile at the-AFC.com
 Profile at AFF Suzuki Cup Site
 Profile at AFF Site
 Timor-Leste at National-Football-Teams.com
2012 AFF Suzuki Cup squad

 
Asian national association football teams